Currumbin Wildlife Sanctuary is a heritage-listed zoological garden at 28 Tomewin Street, Currumbin, Queensland, Australia. It was built in 1947 onwards. It was added to the Queensland Heritage Register on 18 September 2009. The sanctuary is world-renowned for its feeding of huge flocks of free-flying wild rainbow lorikeets, which come to the sanctuary to feast off the special mixture which the lorikeets eat.

The multitude of events, shows and attractions include dingo encounters, free flight bird shows and feeding of the park's massive saltwater crocodile. The park also contains a serious aspect of its work and exhibits, and behind the scenes includes a state-of-the-art veterinary and rehabilitation hospital.

The sanctuary was opened as the Currumbin Bird Sanctuary by Alex Griffiths in 1947 as a scheme to stop the local lorikeet population destroying his flower plantations. The lorikeets still flock to the sanctuary twice daily to be fed by visitors. The sanctuary now houses one of the largest collections of Australian native species in the world. Exhibits include Tasmanian devils, a reptile house and in December 2017 the sanctuary opened their new exotics precinct Lost Valley which is home to lemurs, red pandas, capybara, cotton-top tamarins, tree kangaroos and one of largest walk-through aviary in the Southern Hemisphere with free flying birds. The sanctuary also has a miniature railway that has been operating since 1964. In May 2011, the hospital has appealed for donations and government support as it faces a funding shortage that may force it to turn away injured wildlife.

History 
The Currumbin Wildlife Sanctuary was established by beekeeper and floriculturist Alex Griffiths in 1947 as a small-scale tourist venture featuring lorikeet feeding displays in which tourists could participate. By at least 1953 it was known as the Currumbin Bird Sanctuary and by the mid-1950s had become an iconic tourist attraction on the Gold Coast. The place had evolved by the early 1970s to offer visitors a variety of experiences, including:
 the chance to see numerous bird and animal species and learn about their part in the regional natural environment;
 take a miniature train ride around the large site
 purchase souvenirs
 enjoy a meal.

In 1976 Griffiths gifted the sanctuary to the National Trust of Queensland (the Trust), and the terms of this exchange and its ongoing operation are set out in the Currumbin Bird Sanctuary Act 1976. The place was renamed the Currumbin Wildlife Sanctuary in 1995. It continues to be operated by the Trust as a nature-based tourism enterprise and is recognised as one of the oldest of its kind to remain in operation in the state.

The sanctuary lands gifted by Alex Griffith to the Trust encompassed four main areas:
 the original sanctuary site on the southern side of Tomewin Street and three contiguous properties in Teemangum Street, including a house occupied by Alex Griffiths from 1971 until 1998
 a car park and a picnic ground on the northern side of Tomewin Street
  of heavily treed land on the western side of the Gold Coast Highway, known as the Western Reserve
The Trust also took over the leasehold of:
 swampy land on either side of Flat Rock Creek formerly leased by Griffiths for sanctuary purposes
 a tunnel that Griffith had constructed under the Gold Coast Highway, linking the Tomewin Street site and the Western Reserve.

The Currumbin area was taken up as timber leases in the 1860s and 1870s, with some gold fossicking in the creek in the late 1870s. The coastal strip was subdivided into housing allotments in 1886, but was slow to develop. Access to the area at that time was via a coach service that used the beach as a roadway. Bananas were a successful crop from the late nineteenth century and became a key industry in the Currumbin Valley in the twentieth century. In 1903 a rail line between Nerang and Tweed Heads was constructed, and a siding built at Currumbin in 1908 to cater for timber getters and dairy farmers. The Currumbin School opened the following year. During the 1920s and 1930s a rapid rise in private motor vehicle ownership, the construction of a new coastal road (the Pacific Highway) between Brisbane and Southport, and the opening of the Jubilee Bridge over the Nerang River, led to the subdivision and sale of many estates between Southport and the New South Wales border including Currumbin, especially after the final section of the Pacific Highway, between Currumbin and Coolangatta, opened in December 1933.

It is ironic that the Currumbin Bird Sanctuary, a nature-based venture, emerged from the post-World War II development boom that saw the Gold Coast establish its present iconic identity as Queensland's premier tourist destination. In the 1950s a greater capacity to pursue leisure, increasing ownership and usage of private motor vehicles, and a growing preference among holidaymakers for American-style resorts and tourist entertainments, resulted in changed accommodation styles on the Gold Coast and increased patronage of "tourist attractions" other than the natural attractions of surf beaches and estuary bathing and fishing. With the lifting of war-time building restrictions in 1952, an intense period of building development and property speculation at the South Coast followed, attracting entrepreneurs focussed largely on the tourism potential of the place. The term "Gold Coast" was coined in response to this promise of prosperity and wealth, and was embraced by locals. The South Coast Town Council officially changed its name to Gold Coast Town Council in 1958, and in 1959 the municipality was declared a city.

The Currumbin Bird Sanctuary evolved from the flower-farming and bee-keeping activities of Alexander Morris Griffiths. Born in New Zealand in 1911, his family moved in 1927 to Norfolk Island, where they grew bananas for the Sydney market. His parents retired to Currumbin in 1941, acquiring two adjoining parcels of land comprising  in Tomewin Street in February 1944. Alex joined them and at their Currumbin property established bee hives, planted gladioli, and ran a small road-side stall selling honey and flowers. However, local lorikeets proved problematic, destroying the marketability of the flowers and eating the honey from the hives. The diversionary solution Griffiths devised to protect his flower crop was to feed the birds honey and bread from a plate. The birds increased in numbers to a point where visitors would come to witness the afternoon feedings. Around 1947 Griffiths erected a small kiosk on Tomewin Street to sell his honey and Devonshire teas. The lorikeet-feeding spectacle continued to gain renown and was included in South Coast tourism promotional material. Griffiths did not charge admission fees to his sanctuary but left a donation box near the exit. He also became the unofficial wildlife carer of the district, caring for fauna in his home and utilising small structures in the sanctuary for sick and recuperating birds and animals.

Soon after Griffiths established his nascent bird sanctuary, another nature-based tourism venture commenced in nearby Tallebudgera Valley in 1951 with the establishment of David Fleay Wildlife Park. Fleay had a similar philosophy to Griffiths arguing that fauna should be kept in conditions as close as possible to the natural environment, and was critical of modern zoos; however, Griffiths began as an entrepreneurial amateur while Fleay was a naturalist with scientific training, and before moving to Queensland, when still in Victoria, had been responsible for the first successful captive breeding programs of a number of Australian indigenous animals.

During the early 1950s Griffiths expanded his bird sanctuary with the acquisition of more land on the southern side of Tomewin Street, and utilised the adjacent public reserves along Flat Rock Creek. When an application was made for a dredging lease in the Scenic Reserve (R.579) along the creek in January 1956, Griffiths wrote a letter to the editor of The Courier-Mail protesting against the proposed sand mining because he had spent years encouraging wild birds to Flat Rock Creek. He received widespread public support and petitions against the sand mining were lodged. The Land Commissioner inspected the creek and noted that it contained a permanent waterhole frequented by wild ducks, pigmy geese and black swans. He also reported that the South Coast Town Council valued the bird sanctuary as an important tourist attraction and endorsed Griffiths' actions in preserving wildlife. A number of conservation organisations, including the Queensland Naturalists Club and the Save the Trees Campaign, also objected to the sand mining, arguing that, in the wake of other recent sand mining operations on the coast that had caused the loss of many native trees, Currumbin Sanctuary provided alternative food and shelter to displaced birds. The dredging application was withdrawn. This early example of a conservation battle waged on the South Coast occurred twelve years prior to Fleay's battle to save Tallebudgera Creek from canal development.

The sanctuary had gained such a level of renown that in October 1956 the (American) National Geographic sent top-ranking nature photographer and journalist Dr Paul Zahl to document the lorikeet-feeding phenomena. He described a scene of expectant lorikeets and tourists waiting for Alex Griffiths to fill pie tins with a mixture of bread, water and honey, and the delight of tourists when allowed to feed the birds. By this time Griffiths had other indigenous wildlife on the property and was well known as a wildlife carer of sick and injured animals and birds. No bird was kept in captivity if it was able to fly. Zahl reported that the sanctuary already had a national profile, attracting 2000 visitors on holiday weekends, but the publication of his article gave it an international profile that enhanced its tourism potential and that of the South Coast.

The 1960s was a significant period of expansion for the sanctuary. In 1963 Griffiths was given a licence to enclose the road between the sanctuary and the creek, and a lease on the Scenic Reserve on the banks of Flat Rock Creek contiguous with the road. Around this time he installed a neon sign within the road licence area facing onto Flat Rock Creek, which was visible to travellers along the main road. In June 1964, a miniature railway was introduced. Built in Brisbane by James Jackson, the train hauled six passenger cars and operated on an eleven-inch gauge rail loop for  around the Tomewin Street site. Other elements of this expansion scheme included the construction of an octagonal-shaped Rock Shop (now known as the Spirit of the Outback shop), for which planning approval was given by the Gold Coast City Council in April 1964; and a butterfly display which is no longer extant. Both projects cost . The Rock Shop showcased Griffiths' passion for rock collecting and included the production of jewellery on site. He claimed it was the first of its type in Australia. The octagonal form of the Rock Shop was replicated in most of the buildings constructed at the sanctuary during the 1960s and into the 1970s, although the Rock Shop Annex constructed in 1965 did not adhere to this precept. Griffiths formed a number of companies during this time and began acquiring additional lands around his sanctuary under company title, including parcels in Tomewin Street opposite the sanctuary for car parking.

In the past, Queensland tourist attractions featuring animals and birds were mostly limited to zoos, such as:
 Queensport Aquarium (1889–1995)
 Koombul Park near Cairns (early 1900s)
 Brisbane Botanic Gardens (early 1900s – 1952)
 Rockhampton Botanic Gardens (established 1905 and extant in 2009)
 Hartley's Creek Crocodile Farm north of Cairns (1934 and still operational in 2009)
One of the earliest nature-based tourism ventures was The Jungle near Malanda on the Atherton Tableland in far north Queensland, which showcased indigenous flora and fauna and Aboriginal culture from 1920 until the 1970s. In south-east Queensland, the Lone Pine Koala Sanctuary was established in 1927, in response to the last open season on koalas, which had yielded 500,000 skins.

On the South Coast, Alex Griffiths' serendipitous establishment of the Currumbin Sanctuary in 1947 was the first tourism venture to showcase fauna in an essentially natural setting. Animal attractions at the Gold Coast have tended to concentrate on their entertainment or curiosity value – such as the small zoo and aquarium established at the rebuilt Surfers Paradise Hotel in 1936. The 1950s saw the establishment of Natureland Zoo at Coolangatta and Jack Evans' erroneously named Pet Porpoise Pool at Snapper Rocks, featuring performing dolphins kept in captivity. Evans relocated to Tweed Heads in 1961. Marineland was established on The Spit at Southport in 1966 and Keith Williams' Ski World relocated from Carrara to The Spit in 1970. In 1972 Williams renamed the attraction Sea World, introduced dolphins and Californian sea lions, and built a marine stadium, chairlift and other attractions. He purchased Marineland in 1976 and transferred marine life displays to Sea World. He also purchased Jack Evan's Porpoise Pool business at this time. Marineland then became Bird Life Park. The only venture similar to the Currumbin Bird Sanctuary on the Gold Coast was David Fleay's Fauna Reserve at West Burleigh, which had a greater focus on scientific research.

In April 1968, Griffiths announced that in the next two years he planned to develop the sanctuary into a substantial wildlife attraction utilising  of land on the western side of the highway, to which he acquired title in October 1968. The site was part of a former dairy and banana farm, and retained a number of artificial ponds or dams at the southern end, patches of subtropical rainforest in the north-western corner, and some transitional forest. Griffiths' plans for the property included a two-mile extension of the miniature railway, and a large aviary encompassing mature trees for birds unable to survive in the wild. The chain of lagoons and ponds along a secondary watercourse to Flat Rock Creek would provide a habitat for water fowl. He also planned a new three-storeyed kiosk on the Tomewin Street site and employed architect Stephen Trotter of the firm Fulton Collin Boys Gilmour Trotter & Partners to prepare a design. He was also negotiating with the Main Roads Department to build a tunnel under the planned new four lane highway to link the two properties. In the late 1960s the Gold Coast City Council demonstrated its support for Griffiths' work by constructing an illuminated fountain in Flat Rock Creek adjacent to the sanctuary, visible at night to passers by on the highway. It is understood that this structure is no longer extant.

The new Kiosk opened in March 1972, at a cost of about $120,000. It was a three-storey building made around a concrete frame with some stone wall facings, brick infill and large sliding doors, in an octagonal plan that reflected the approach taken to earlier structures on the site. The architect recalls that this plan geometry was intended to reference the individual chambers of a beehive (although these are hexagonal). With a central lift and stairs, the building had a basement housing service facilities; a main kiosk level that opened to both the street and to the lorikeet-feeding arena; and a mezzanine level used as a VIP lounge. The concrete tiled hipped roof had exposed timber framing on the interior and a large skylight at its apex.

In 1972 Hugh Sawrey (1919–1999), a Queensland-born artist who in the 1970s and 1980s developed a national reputation for his paintings depicting Australian outback life, was commissioned to paint a large mural in the main level of the Kiosk. By 1972 Sawrey kept a successful horse stud at Coomera on the Gold Coast, which he moved that year to Boonah and to Victoria in 1978. His was the inspiration behind of the establishment of the Australian Stockman's Hall of Fame and Outback Heritage Centre at Longreach, which opened in 1988, and he was a strong supporter of Alex Griffiths' work at Currumbin.

Griffiths' parents' house and a neighbouring property, the former Currumbin Tea Gardens, were demolished for the construction of the new Kiosk. Griffiths then moved to another property that he owned in adjacent Teemangum Street – a small, early 1950s fibro cottage with an attached shop.

During the early 1970s negotiations continued on the construction of a tunnel under the Gold Coast Highway linking the existing sanctuary to the new Western Reserve. This was built in conjunction with the construction of a four lane highway and new Currumbin Creek Bridge, which opened in November 1974. Leases on the reserves on either side of Flat Rock Creek were secured and eventually a new Reserve for Parks and Recreation (R.579) was gazetted in December 1977. The road reserve between the sanctuary and the Flat Rock Creek leased land was closed in 1993, formally enlarging the sanctuary.

Between 1969 and 1973, Griffiths also acquired  in the Currumbin Valley that he named Coolamon, an aboriginal word for carry basket, and also the name of the tree which is the floral emblem of the neighbouring Tweed Shire. Coolamon was used as a release area for rehabilitated fauna. It was also considered a possible venue for further educational purposes as it retained remnants of indigenous vegetation.

By the early 1970s facilities on the formally laid out site on Tomewin Street included: the original kiosk and fernery, the lorikeet-feeding arena, the Rock Shop and its annex, the new Kiosk, the miniature railway and its butterfly-roofed station shelter, a number of aviaries (including a Rainforest Aviary), a bakery, a mini-cars course, an aquarium, a collector's corner, and a children's playground called Fairyland. This area was complemented by the more informally laid out Western Reserve which housed an array of indigenous fauna, some free ranging. One loop of the miniature railway existed around the southern part of the Western Reserve, travelling along Flat Rock Creek and crossing a chain of lagoons in order to showcase the water birds that frequented the site. There was a small siding (no longer extant) near the current Koala Junction Station. Visitation in 1973 was estimated at 600,000 per annum.

Around this time Griffiths sought to find an organisation to take on the management of the sanctuary, stating: "I wanted to make sure that on my death the Sanctuary would continue its work as a haven for wildlife... As you can see, I had to ensure that these creatures always had a safe place to come, even after I am gone." He began negotiations with the National Trust of Queensland with a view to gifting the sanctuary to them. This necessitated the drafting of legislation to allow the Trust to take over the property, which was assented to on 3 November 1976. The Currumbin Bird Sanctuary Act 1976 made provision for the Trust to wind up the companies set up by Griffiths to manage various aspects of the sanctuary. These were dissolved early in 1977 so that the sanctuary could operate as a commercial undertaking in its own right. The gifted properties were formally transferred to the Trust between 9 and 15 March 1978. As part of the new management structure, a Board of Advice was established to which Alex Griffiths was appointed Chairman for life. He stepped aside in favour of retired Governor of Queensland Sir Colin Hannah, who was then succeeded by Sir Sholto Douglas. In 1980 the Trust produced a comprehensive development plan with ambitious ideas for the redevelopment of the park, aimed at removing all unserviceable or outdated structures, particularly old aviaries, and adapting existing serviceable buildings. In late 1980 the Trust discontinued the Board of Advice, effectively negating Alex Griffith's role as an advisor to the sanctuary.

Both the Trust's need to operate the sanctuary as a commercial venture and Alex Griffith's desire to keep it as a fauna and flora reserve were embodied within the 1976 act, but Griffiths became increasingly estranged from the Trust and its management of the sanctuary. There were philosophical differences between his layman's perception of conservation, and the scientific approach which opposed artificial feeding of wildlife and the maintenance of exotic species. Griffiths had always kept exotic species at the sanctuary and continued to house peacocks at Coolamon, where he moved to live in a caravan from around Christmas 1982. During the 1980s he continued to invest in this property, installing three landscaped dams, a concrete weir and spillways, and a hardwood vehicular bridge.

The Trust pursued an active program of site development through the 1980s with the construction of a children's playground (1985–1986), refurbishment of the Rainforest Aviary as the Rainforest Pool Aviary (1987), and construction of a Sub-Tropical Aviary (1988). In the 1990s a number of new facilities were constructed, including the Sir Walter Campbell Environmental Education centre, a new koala exhibit, the Koala Junction Kiosk, a freshwater crocodile display, a Tasmanian devil enclosure, four new cockatoo aviaries, and Flora Gully (which included rare and endangered species of plants). None of these elements is considered to be of cultural heritage significance for the purposes of this entry in the Queensland heritage register. At this period the Trust also made major renovations to the main administration building, extended the Kiosk to incorporate a shop and the nearby Honey House, and renovated two aviaries.

In 1995 the Trust adopted a long-term goal for the place: Currumbin Sanctuary was to be recognised nationally and internationally as a pre-eminent institution in the preservation and presentation of Australian indigenous fauna and flora, and in sustaining and promoting heritage-related values and ideas. The name was changed to Currumbin Wildlife Sanctuary to reflect this objective. 1996 visitation statistics showed 82,000 local, 96,000 interstate and 340,000 international visitors.

Alex Griffiths died on 29 July 1998. He had received numerous awards during his life: he became a Member in the Order of Australia in 1976; was awarded the Order of the White Cross for protection of wildlife in 1977; along with fellow Gold Coast environmentalist David Fleay was given "Freedom of the City" of the Gold Coast by Mayor Lex Bell in 1989; and received an Honorary Doctorate from Griffith University in 1995. In 1999 Gold Coast City Council named a nearby open space in Teemangum Street, Alex Griffiths Park.

The significance of the Currumbin Wildlife Sanctuary within its local context was recognised in the 1997 Gold Coast Urban Heritage and Character Study which stated: "The Currumbin Area is one of a particular character... Generally the area contains more natural vegetation that other areas of the coast due in part to the difficulty of building on the steep hillsides and in part to the presence of the Currumbin Bird Sanctuary – a long standing icon and landmark of the Gold Coast." Its significance in Queensland has been recognised recently through its inclusion in the Royal Automobile Club of Queensland's "150 must do's" as well as being voted one of the top 15 iconic Queensland locations as part of the State's sesquicentenary celebrations (Q150). The sanctuary continues to draw tourists from around Australia and internationally. Visitation statistics for 2007–2008 indicate 148,000 local, 98,000 interstate and 150,000 international visitors. While local visitation has almost doubled in the past 12 years, international visitors' numbers have dropped markedly, reflective of a general downturn in international tourists visiting the State.

Of the facilities existing at the time of Alex Griffiths' gift to the Trust in 1976, only the Kiosk, Spirit of the Outback Store (former Rock Shop) and its annex, miniature railway (particularly its original circuit on the Tomewin Street site and its southernmost circuit on the Western Reserve), the refurbished Rainforest Pool Aviary, site of the lorikeet-feeding arena, and one small octagonal building (possibly a former bird hospital), remain. All of the properties retain significant remnant indigenous vegetation, which Griffiths retained as part of the concept of a flora reserve, and as a sheltering and breeding place for fauna.

In 2008, a dedicated frog-breeding facility was established.

Description 

The extent of land included within the heritage boundary for the Currumbin Wildlife Sanctuary encompasses: all those freeholds gifted to the National Trust of Queensland in 1976 and transferred to it in March 1978; and a number of leaseholds along Flat Rock Creek and over the tunnel under the Gold Coast Highway. The heritage boundary does not include freehold properties acquired by the Trust after March 1978.

The sanctuary lands that have been included within the heritage register boundary form two discrete areas: 
 the main sanctuary with its tourist facilities, located in the suburb of Currumbin on the Gold Coast
 a property known as Coolamon situated just over nine kilometres to the south-west in the Currumbin Valley, adjacent to the Nicoll Scrub National Park.

Within the heritage boundary, only those facilities associated with Alex Griffith's management of the site are considered to be of cultural heritage significance for the purposes of this entry in the Queensland heritage register.

The main sanctuary 
It is nestled within an area where the high-rise buildings that characterise development elsewhere on the Gold Coast are absent. The sanctuary lands here are intersected by the Gold Coast Highway, which runs north-west to south-east, and Tomewin Street, oriented south-west to north-east.

There are four identifiable areas within the main sanctuary:
 three on the eastern side of the highway:
 the original sanctuary site on the southern side of Tomewin Street
 adjacent reserve lands around Flat Rock Creek (leased from the Gold Coast City Council)
 a car park and picnic ground on the northern side of Tomewin Street
 a substantial area of land to the west of the Gold Coast Highway, known as the Western Reserve.
A tunnel under the highway links the eastern and western sides of the main sanctuary.

East of the highway and south of Tomewin Street 
The largest expanse of sanctuary land on the eastern side of the Gold Coast Highway is bordered to the north-west by Tomewin Street, to the south-west by Flat Rock Creek, to the north-east by houses and vacant allotments that front Teemangum Street, and to the south-east by a large residential unit development. It covers almost one and a half hectares. The northern end of this area contains the entrance to the sanctuary, leading to a formal complex of structures, miniature train lines and landscaping elements, including a number of facilities installed pre-1976. These include: the Spirit of the Outback Store or former Rock Shop and its annex (completed 1964 and 1965); the three-storeyed Kiosk building (completed 1972, extended 1989 and early 1990s); large sections of the miniature train line; a small fibrous-cement clad building in the south-east corner of the site; and the refurbished Rainforest Pool Aviary at the south-east corner of the Kiosk building. The present lorikeet-feeding arena occupies the same site and shares the same general arrangement employed by Alex Griffiths in his bird-feeding spectacles from at least the early 1950s.

The southern side of Tomewin Street forms the public face of the sanctuary, with parking and drop-off bays along its length being shaded by established trees, which are particularly dense towards the highway. The composite-frame, brick and steel sheet-roofed building that lines a significant part of this roadway behind the street trees is based around the 1972 Kiosk, which since completion had been the entry to the sanctuary. This building is organised around interlocking octagonal plan-forms. The entry used by visitors prior to Easter 2009 is now marked by a large pergola made with timber rafters spanning between the building and a steel semi-circular beam that is supported on two steel columns encased in fibreglass resembling tree trunks. A single glass door provides access via a set of stairs to the administration area. A further line of glass doors and windows completes this facade.

The largest and the most significant component of this building occupies the easternmost end and houses: a service zone in its basement; on its ground floor a cafe and Hugh Sawrey Room where the artist's large mural is located, toilets, and some conference accommodation to the north-east; and administration offices on the upper mezzanine level. Within this three-level structure is the 1972 octagonally planned Kiosk. It has an upper level surmounted by a hipped eight-panelled roof with a separate, raised clerestory section at the apex and small dormer windows in all but one of its panels, which was installed during the 1989 renovation. On its north-eastern side is a narrow verandah off the conference rooms. On the opposite side a large expanse of timber decking (1989) opens out from the cafe and allows visitors to eat under the trees and observe the adjacent lorikeet-feeding arena to the west.

The renovated Kiosk sits on a concrete slab, which supports a central concrete access core and the floor slabs for the main and mezzanine levels. The doors and windows are largely aluminium-framed. The eaves and its wide fascia panels are lined with narrow, stained timber boards. To the south and west a large timber-framed deck area wraps around this building, creating a transition zone between the cafe and its central servery and the lorikeet-feeding arena and entrance to the Spirit of the Outback store (former Rock Shop). It is raised off the ground by approximately one metre and is cutaway to allow for the growth of a number of trees, including a number of palms. A broad timber ramp provides access on the south-west corner into the heart of this sanctuary site.

Appended to the Kiosk in 1989 to the north-west is the former shop, which currently serves as the main entrance to the sanctuary and is planned around two partial octagons, one opening toward the street, and the other at the western end opening into the lorikeet-feeding arena. Further to the west along Tomewin Street, and also part of the 1989 Kiosk development project, is a stone-faced platform supporting a shade structure and some seating. Beyond these to the west is the Honey House, which has a room where the lorikeet food is prepared; and a large steel-framed aviary (Forest Fringe Aviary, 1990). These structures are not considered to be of significance.

Behind these structures, but still visible from Tomewin Street, is the lorikeet-feeding arena. It comprises a section of ground shaped like a rectangle with rounded ends and separated from the surrounding ground by a low steel fence. The largely flat surrounding surface falls to a drainage line inside this fence before levelling out in the centre. This drainage zone is concreted. Inside an outer ring of grass is a rockery. At either ends are the painted steel, lorikeet-feeding Ferris wheels, which were a signature of the early sanctuary and its bird-feeding displays. While these are later constructions they closely resemble those designed and used by Alex Griffiths. The area also has a few small trees, two clipped hedge shrubs and some other ground cover plantings within the arena. Beyond the narrow strip of concrete that falls outside the fence-line the ground is covered with artificial turf.

The lorikeet-feeding arena forms part of a larger internal open space that constitutes the visitor's first experience of the sanctuary and is bounded to the north-west and east by the structures already described. On its south-eastern side is the entrance to the octagonally planned Spirit of the Outback store (former Rock Shop, 1964). There are a number of mature trees in this area, including eucalypts, as well as some areas of lawn and paving concentrated around the decks to the cafe and leading to various connections on the edges of the space.

Adjacent to the Kiosk building, against the south-eastern boundary of the site, sits a large steel-framed and wire-mesh-enclosed aviary housing nocturnal birds and animals (pre-1970, refurbished in 1987 as the Rainforest Pool Aviary). This features a rock wall and small waterfall. A length of miniature train track runs through a fence opposite this aviary and up to the concrete block structure described earlier. This marks an earlier course of the miniature train line. The Spirit of the Outback store (former Rock Shop) is founded on a concrete slab with a sloping skirt around the entire building and expressed columns at each wall joint, which hide the downpipes. These consist of a concrete casing. It has a hipped roof clad in corrugated steel and walls faced with stone. Its wide fascia panels and eaves are lined with fibrous-cement sheeting. Inside there is a cathedral ceiling with fibrous-cement sheeting behind narrow timber rafters. The walls are also lined with fibrous-cement sheeting.

A south-facing doorway in the former Rock Shop allows visitors into the sanctuary. To the immediate east of this doorway stands the annex built in 1965 to a rectangular plan but with similar materials. To the south-west of this is situated the main train station platform. To the south is the landing of an elevated timber walkway leading into the south-eastern corner of the site and then into the Green Cauldron enclosure, which sits near the site's southern boundary and incorporates at least two earlier building phases carried out after the early 1980s. The Green Guardian Theatre building (1990) sits between this structure and the main train platform. The last four structures are not considered of significance.

In the south-eastern corner of the site, visible only to visitors on the walkway, is a fibrous-cement clad building, likely to be one of the oldest structures on the site. It is octagonal in plan and has a concertinaed, hip and valley roof made with flat fibrous-cement sheets and barge boards individual to each roof face. Its walls are similarly clad. It has a number of aluminium-framed, sliding windows. The timber walkway area is shaded by a number of mature trees, which shelter this structure from potentially damaging hail and wind. It sits behind a high chain-wire and thatched fence.

To the west the site is bounded by a wide avenue of paving beside a screen of paperbarks (Melaleuca sp.) and gum trees (Eucalyptus sp.) lining the lorikeet habitat of Flat Rock Creek. Between it and the lorikeet-feeding arena are a number of enclosures housing koalas. To the east is the entrance to the Green Guardian Theatre (1990). Toward the north-west, the paved way leads to the concrete tunnel that joins the eastern and western sides of the sanctuary.

Two small residential allotments and a concreted laneway on Teemangum Street (the latter providing service access to the Kiosk building) are also included within the heritage boundary. A single-storeyed fibrous-cement clad house, where Alex Griffiths chiefly resided between 1971 and 1998, with an attached shop, sits on one of these allotments, but is not considered to be of cultural heritage significance for the purposes of this entry in the Queensland heritage register.

East of the highway and north of Tomewin Street 
This contains the sanctuary's car parking facilities fronting Tomewin Street and adjacent to a commercial development on the west, and between the car park and a private hospital to the north, a large grassed and treed picnic area. There are some mature trees on the car park site, including a hoop pine (Araucaria cunninghamii) at the entrance, paperbarks (Melaleuca sp.) and mature Moreton Bay figs (Ficus macrophylla).

Reserves 
A number of lagoons exist here, and form a bird habitat.

Western Reserve 
Only those facilities associated with Alex Griffith's management of the site are considered to be of cultural heritage significance.

The site slopes steeply to the west and north from low-lying areas along the eastern and southern boundaries where Flat Rock Creek winds its way toward the ocean. Bounded by Currumbin Hill Conservation Park to the north-east, it is otherwise enclosed by residential allotments along the north-western ridge topped by Lansell Avenue and along the western and southern curve of Crest Avenue. It meets Thrower Drive in the north and borders Crest Drive where it forms a south-west-facing corner. The residences on the north-western side of Farrell Drive also border the sanctuary and the long thin lake or lagoon formed by Flat Rock Creek.

Emerging from the tunnel leading from the eastern side of the sanctuary, a miniature train line loops around the largely flat areas along Flat Rock Creek, dividing near a spot name Koala Junction to head north and south. Pathways lead visitors west from the tunnel through a vegetated zone on the northern side of the creek. Further west is a junction of paths and rail lines, to the south-west of which is the Koala Junction Kiosk and amenities block. These buildings are not considered to be of cultural heritage significance.

To the north of Koala Junction are a number of post-1976 structures, enclosures and animal displays, again not considered to be of cultural heritage significance. These include an early 1990s building that provides access to the Extreme Green Challenge on the slopes behind it to the west, and the animal displays in the north-western corner of this site. At the highest point on this side of the Western Reserve there is a timber-framed and decked lookout that can be accessed via steep stairs. It takes in a view of the ocean and some of the residential development on Currumbin Hill and to the south-east around Tugun. It is a structure planned for but not carried out by Alex Griffiths.

Paths wind back down the slope to the south-east and onto a path that passes three steel-tube-framed aviaries on its way down the slope. At the end of this path are the various other animal enclosures; again, these are not of heritage significance.

The area of land to the west of these paths and enclosures that borders the upper part of Crest Drive and Lansell Avenue is the most heavily treed, with a range of Australian indigenous species. Beyond it, in the south and south-western corners of the Western Reserve, are a series of small ponds or dams (extant when Griffiths purchased the land in 1968) along a watercourse that joins Flat Rock Creek from the west. The train line loops through this system of ponds, over a steel bridge reputedly installed by Griffiths after he had purchased this property. The paths lead along the southern edge of these lakes, under a number of mature trees, to a timber viewing platform and small tea-house building.

At the southern end of the Western Reserve, below the chain of artificially created ponds that lead into Flat Rock Creek, are a number of structures not considered to be of cultural heritage significance: three disused timber and concrete block aviaries; an amphitheatre consisting of stepped seating; a former cafe; and some animal enclosures.

Coolamon 
Coolamon comprises four allotments, totalling almost  of land, located in the Currumbin Valley about halfway between the headwaters of Currumbin Creek and the ocean into which it drains, where Currumbin Creek Road turns toward the Queensland and New South Wales border about one and a half kilometres from the site to the south. Nicoll Scrub National Park adjoins the southernmost allotment to the south-east. There are two gated access points, one to the north, which follows an easement to the main body of the site, and another, the main entrance adjacent to a picnic ground in the south-west. The latter entrance is signed and comprises a steel-framed gate with chain-wire infill set within two tall steel posts and panels of ribbed metal sheeting, which provides access to a section of bitumen roadway. Elsewhere the site is fenced by chain-wire. Adjacent to this gate to the north-west is a toilet block overgrown by vegetation. Opposite this structure and across the roadway a grassed picnic area stretches toward the south. Beyond this are the remains of a timber bridge. A caravan sits at the southern end of the grassed area. Coolamon has in the recent past provided picnic facilities to visitors but currently only serves as a release area for birds and other native animals treated at the sanctuary's hospital (the latter is not located within the heritage boundary).

Species kept at the sanctuary

Alex Griffin's Aviary

Brown cuckoo-dove
Eastern whipbird
Green catbird
Little lorikeet
Mary River Turtle
Sacred kingfisher
Turquoise parrot
Wompoo fruit-dove

Entrance Exhibits

Cape Barren goose
Koala
Red-necked wallaby
Short-beaked echidna
Tammar wallaby

Ngagan (Reptile) & Nocturnal Species Den

Black-headed python
Boyd's forest dragon
Broad-headed snake
Cane toad
Centralian rough knob-tailed gecko
Collett's snake
Feathertail glider
Freshwater Australian bass (perch)
Frilled-neck lizard
Ghost bat
Greater bilby
Magnificent tree frog
Northern brown bandicoot
Queensland lungfish
Southern greater glider
Short-beaked echidna
Spinifex hopping mouse
Spiny-tailed monitor
Spotted black snake
Spotted python
Squirrel glider

Chungurra (Pelican) Country
Australian pelican

Forest Fringe Aviary

Bar-shouldered dove
Brown cuckoo-dove
Common bronzewing
Crested pigeon
Rose-crowned fruit-dove
Sacred kingfisher
White-browed woodswallow
Wompoo fruit-dove

Garima (Conservation) Country

American alligator
Black-necked stork
Eastern long-neck turtle
Tasmanian devil

Garima (Conservation} Aviaries

Brown cuckoo-dove
Brush bronzewing
Chestnut-breasted mannikin
Cockatiel
Eastern whipbird
Gouldian finch
Hooded robin
Little lorikeet
Luzon bleeding-heart dove
Musk lorikeet
Orange-bellied parrot
Red-browed fig parrot
Regent honeyeater
Spinifex pigeon
Star finch
Superb fairywren
Wompoo fruit-dove

Bubura (Bush) Country

Australian king parrot
Bar-shouldered dove
Bush stone-curlew
Cockatiel
Crested pigeon
Dingo
Eclectus parrot
Gang-gang cockatoo
Grey-headed flying fox
Koala
Major Mitchell's cockatoo
Princess parrot
Red-tailed black cockatoo
Southern hairy-nosed wombat
Superb parrot
Tawny frogmouth

Muni (Kangaroo) Country

Brush-tailed rock wallaby
Eastern grey kangaroo
Emu
Freshwater crocodile
Red kangaroo
Red-legged pademelon
Red-necked wallaby
Saltwater crocodile
Swamp wallaby

Lost Valley

Binturong
Black-capped lory
Blue-and-gold macaw
Boa constrictor
Boyd's forest dragon-
Brown cuckoo-dove
Buff-banded rail
Bush stone-curlew
Chattering lory
Corn snake
Cotton-top tamarin
Eclectus parrot
Glossy ibis
Golden pheasant
Goodfellow's tree-kangaroo
Greater capybara
Green iguana
Lumholtz's tree-kangaroo
Luzon bleeding-heart dove
Mandarin duck
Moluccan lory
Nicobar pigeon
Pacific emerald dove
Red panda
Ring-tailed lemur
Satin bowerbird
Southern cassowary
Sun conure
Torresian imperial pigeon
White-bibbed ground dove
White-headed pigeon
Wonga pigeon

Scales & Tails Show

Central bearded dragon
Darwin carpet python
Dingo
Shingleback lizard
Stimson's python
Tasmanian brushtail possum

Wild Skies Show

Australian king parrot
Australian pelican
Barking owl
Black kite
Blue-and-gold macaw
Bush stone-curlew
Galah
Green-winged macaw
Major Mitchell's cockatoo
Masked owl
Red-tailed black cockatoo
Yellow-tailed black cockatoo
Wedge-tailed eagle

Other Species
Kroombit tinker frog
Rainbow lorikeet (wild roaming)

Frog-breeding
In 2008, a dedicated frog-breeding facility was established, specifically to try to breed the critically endangered Kroombit tinker frog. The major threat to its existence, apart from climate change, less habitat and certain pests, is chytrid fungus.

In 2020, scientists at the facility bred the Kroombit tinker frog in captivity for the first time ever, raising hopes of preventing extinction. They had been trying since around 2000, but it was only when the Currumbin offered the facility that the work could properly begin. They eventually managed to bring about a spawning by their captive frogs, and the first tadpole metamorphosed into a frog in November 2020.

Heritage listing 
Currumbin Wildlife Sanctuary was listed on the Queensland Heritage Register on 18 September 2009, having satisfied the following criteria.

The place is important in demonstrating the evolution or pattern of Queensland's history.

The Currumbin Wildlife Sanctuary, established by Alex Griffiths in 1947 as the Currumbin Bird Sanctuary, is important in demonstrating the evolution of nature-based tourism in Queensland. It is an early surviving attraction at the Gold Coast, Queensland's premiere tourism destination, and one of the earliest nature-based tourist facilities established in Queensland, evolving from a site of local interest and the public spectacle of lorikeet-feeding to an internationally recognised nature-based tourism attraction.

The place has a strong or special association with a particular community or cultural group for social, cultural or spiritual reasons.

As an iconic Queensland tourist destination, Currumbin Wildlife Sanctuary has had a strong association as an attractive nature-based tourism experience for the large community of Queenslanders who have visited the site since 1947, when the afternoon lorikeet-feeding spectacle was established by Alex Griffiths. The strength and endurance of this association are powerfully demonstrated by its featuring in tourism advertising since 1953 or earlier; by the widespread community support for the sanctuary demonstrated in 1956 when hundreds of people signed a petition objecting to proposed sandmining adjacent to it; by inclusion in the Royal Automobile Club of Queensland's "150 must do's" in Queensland in 2009; and being voted by the community as one of the top 15 iconic Queensland locations during the 2009 State sesquicentenary celebrations.

The place has a special association with the life or work of a particular person, group or organisation of importance in Queensland's history.

Currumbin Wildlife Sanctuary has a special association with the life work of Alex Griffiths who established the sanctuary in 1947 and remained involved in its ongoing management into the early 1980s, after gifting the sanctuary to the National Trust of Queensland (the Trust) in 1976. Important surviving elements of Griffiths' pre-1976 tourism venture include: the Kiosk; the Spirit of the Outback Store (former Rock Shop) and its annex; an aviary; an early bird hospital; the site of the lorikeet-feeding arena; the concept of the miniature railway circuit and much of the original railway on both the Tomewin Street site and the Western Reserve; the tunnel beneath the Gold Coast Highway; the informally laid out Western Reserve; the bird habitat along Flat Rock Creek; and the bird-release property known as Coolamon.

Awards 
In 2009 as part of the Q150 celebrations, the Currumbin Wildlife Sanctuary was announced as one of the Q150 Icons of Queensland for its role as a "location".

References

Attribution

External links

1947 establishments in Australia
Zoos established in 1947
Queensland Heritage Register
Currumbin, Queensland
Zoos in Queensland
Wildlife parks in Australia
Tourist attractions on the Gold Coast, Queensland
Wildlife sanctuaries of Australia
Aviaries
National Trust of Australia
Articles incorporating text from the Queensland Heritage Register
Gold Coast Local Heritage Register